The 1971–72 New York Nets season was the fifth season of the franchise and 4th in New York. They finished 3rd among the six team division, qualifying for the playoffs by nine games for the third straight year.

The Nets advanced to the ABA Finals, where they lost to the Indiana Pacers.

Rick Barry averaged 31.5 points per game in what would be his final season in the ABA. Barry was forced to return to his former NBA team, the Golden State Warriors, due to an injunction issued by the U.S. District Court prohibiting him from playing for any professional team other than the Warriors after his Nets contract ended.

Roster

Final standings

Playoffs
Eastern Division Semifinals vs. Kentucky Colonels

Nets win series, 4–2

Eastern Division Finals vs. Virginia Squires

Nets win series, 4–3

ABA Finals vs. Indiana Pacers

Nets lose series, 4–2

References

New York Nets season
New Jersey Nets seasons
New York Nets
New York Nets
Sports in Hempstead, New York